(born August 8, 1983) is a Japanese professional mixed martial artist and kickboxer. Nishiura currently competes in MMA for the DREAM organization as a Featherweight and has also fought for Shooto, Cage Force, and DEEP.

Mixed martial arts career

DREAM
After compiling a record of 9-3-1 in organizations such as Shooto and Cage Force, Nishiura made his promotional debut with DREAM on March 8, 2009 against Abel Cullum at DREAM 7 in the opening round of the Featherweight Grand Prix, where he lost via unanimous decision. He returned at DREAM 14 in May 2010 and was able to cause an upset by defeating Hideo Tokoro via technical knockout within the first round.

In his next fight at DREAM 16, he faced Mitsuhiro Ishida. Ishida worked frequent takedowns almost exclusively in favor of striking for the 15-minute affair, though Nishiura was able to regain his feet quickly each time. In the second frame, Ishida was able to gain mount, but it was Nishiura who drew first blood with a successful sprawl in the final moments that led to a barrage of hammerfists to his opponent's face. It wasn't enough to sway the judges, who awarded Ishida a split decision win.

Road to UFC: Japan
In June 2015, Nishiura was announced as one of the eight featherweights competing on Road to UFC: Japan, a show in the style of The Ultimate Fighter.  On the show he was scheduled to face Hiroto Uesako in the quarterfinals but Uesako had a hand injury.  He was replaced by Hiroyuki Oshiro and Nishiura won the fight by TKO in the first round.  He then faced Teruto Ishihara in the semifinals and lost by decision.

Kickboxing career
On December 31, 2010, he made his kickboxing debut on the annual New Year's Eve event Dynamite!! against K-1 veteran Tetsuya Yamato. After three rounds, the bout was scored as a draw.

Nishiura entered the 2013 –65 kg S-Cup held at Shoot Boxing Battle Summit Ground Zero Tokyo 2013 in Tokyo, Japan on November 15, 2013. After defeating Masaya by unanimous decision in the quarter-finals, he then faced fellow mixed martial artist Michihiro Omigawa in the semis. The fight was ruled a majority draw after the regulation three rounds and so went to an extension round to produce a winner, after which Omigawa was given the nod by all three judges.

Mixed martial arts record

|-
| Win
| align=center| 14–8–1
| Andy Souwer
| Decision (unanimous)
| Rizin World Grand Prix 2017: Opening Round - Part 2
| 
| align=center| 2
| align=center| 15:00
| Fukuoka, Japan
|
|-
| Win
| align=center| 13–8–1
| Ryogo Takahashi
| Decision (unanimous)
| Shooto: 4th Round 2014
| 
| align=center| 3
| align=center| 5:00
| Tokyo, Japan
| 
|-
| Win
| align=center| 12–8–1
| Shigeki Osawa
| Decision (split)
| Vale Tudo Japan: VTJ 3rd
| 
| align=center| 3
| align=center| 5:00
| Tokyo, Japan
| 
|-
| Loss
| align=center| 11–8–1
| Yuta Nezo
| Decision (unanimous)
| Vale Tudo Japan: VTJ 2nd
| 
| align=center| 3
| align=center| 5:00
| Tokyo, Japan
| 
|-
| Loss
| align=center| 11–7–1
| Caol Uno
| Decision (unanimous)
| Dream: Fight for Japan!
| 
| align=center| 2
| align=center| 5:00
| Saitama, Japan
| 
|-
| Loss
| align=center| 11–6–1
| Mitsuhiro Ishida
| Decision (split)
| DREAM 16
| 
| align=center| 2
| align=center| 5:00
| Nagoya, Japan
| 
|-
| Win
| align=center| 11–5–1
| Hideo Tokoro
| TKO (punches)
| DREAM 14
| 
| align=center| 1
| align=center| 2:51
| Saitama, Japan
| 
|-
| Loss
| align=center| 10–5–1
| Gustavo Falciroli
| Decision (majority)
| Shooto Australia: Superfight Australia 6
| 
| align=center| 3
| align=center| 5:00
| Joondalup, Australia
| 
|-
| Win
| align=center| 10–4–1
| Takumi Ota
| Decision (unanimous)
| Shooto: Shooto Tradition Final
| 
| align=center| 2
| align=center| 5:00
| Tokyo, Japan
| 
|-
| Loss
| align=center| 9–4–1
| Abel Cullum
| Decision (unanimous)
| DREAM 7
| 
| align=center| 2
| align=center| 5:00
| Saitama, Japan
| Featherweight Grand Prix Quarterfinal
|-
| Loss
| align=center| 9–3–1
| Yuji Hoshino
| Decision (unanimous)
| GCM: Cage Force 9
| 
| align=center| 3
| align=center| 5:00
| Tokyo, Japan
| 
|-
| Win
| align=center| 9–2–1
| Fanjin Son
| Decision (unanimous)
| GCM: Cage Force 8
| 
| align=center| 3
| align=center| 5:00
| Tokyo, Japan
| 
|-
| Win
| align=center| 8–2–1
| Matteus Lahdesmaki
| TKO (punches)
| Shooto: Shooto Tradition 2
| 
| align=center| 3
| align=center| 2:17
| Tokyo, Japan
| 
|-
| Win
| align=center| 7-2–1
| Kim Jong-Man
| KO (punches)
| GCM: Cage Force EX Eastern Bound
| 
| align=center| 1
| align=center| 2:13
| Tokyo, Japan
| 
|-
| Draw
| align=center| 6–2–1
| Joe Camacho
| Draw
| Shooto: The Arrival: This is Shooto
| 
| align=center| 3
| align=center| 5:00
| Irvine, California, United States
| 
|-
| Win
| align=center| 6–2
| Hideki Kadowaki
| Decision (split)
| Shooto: Back To Our Roots 2
| 
| align=center| 3
| align=center| 5:00
| Tokyo, Japan
| 
|-
| Loss
| align=center| 5–2
| Akitoshi Tamura
| Decision (unanimous)
| Shooto: Rookie Tournament Final
| 
| align=center| 2
| align=center| 5:00
| Tokyo, Japan
| 
|-
| Win
| align=center| 5–1
| Daisuke Ishizawa
| Decision (unanimous)
| Shooto: Champion Carnival
| 
| align=center| 2
| align=center| 5:00
| Yokohama, Japan
| 
|-
| Win
| align=center| 4–1
| Yuji Inoue
| Decision (unanimous)
| Shooto: Shooting Star
| 
| align=center| 2
| align=center| 5:00
| Tokyo, Japan
| 
|-
| Win
| align=center| 3–1
| Tomonori Taniguchi
| Decision (majority)
| Shooto: 3/3 in Kitazawa Town Hall
| 
| align=center| 2
| align=center| 5:00
| Tokyo, Japan
| 
|-
| Loss
| align=center| 2–1
| Sakae Kasuya
| Decision (majority)
| Shooto 2005: 11/6 in Korakuen Hall
| 
| align=center| 2
| align=center| 5:00
| Tokyo, Japan
| 
|-
| Win
| align=center| 2–0
| Hiroshi Nakamura
| KO (punch)
| Shooto: 5/29 in Kitazawa Town Hall
| 
| align=center| 2
| align=center| 3:57
| Tokyo, Japan
| 
|-
| Win
| align=center| 1–0
| Takshi Sato
| KO (punch)
| Deep: Chonan Festival
| 
| align=center| 1
| align=center| 0:39
| Yamagata, Japan
|

Kickboxing record

|-
|
| Loss
|  Hiroya
| Rizin Fighting Federation 1
| Saitama, Japan
| KO
| 3
| 
|1-3-1
| 
|-
|
|Loss
| Michihiro Omigawa
|Shoot Boxing Battle Summit Ground Zero Tokyo 2013
|Tokyo, Japan
|Extension round decision (unanimous)
|align="center"|4
|align="center"|3:00
|1-2-1
|2013 65 kg S-Cup semi-finals.
|-
|
|Win
| Masaya
|Shoot Boxing Battle Summit Ground Zero Tokyo 2013
|Tokyo, Japan
|Decision (unanimous)
|align="center"|3
|align="center"|3:00
|1-1-1
|2013 65 kg S-Cup quarter-finals.
|-
|
|Loss
| Hiroaki Suzuki
|Shooto the Shoot 2011
|Tokyo, Japan
|Decision (unanimous)
|align="center"|3
|align="center"|3:00
|0-1-1
| 
|-
|
|Draw
| Tetsuya Yamato
|Dynamite!! 2010
|Saitama, Japan
|Decision (majority draw)
|align="center"|3
|align="center"|3:00
|0-0-1
| 
|-
|-
| colspan=10 | Legend:

References

External links

1983 births
Living people
Japanese male mixed martial artists
Bantamweight mixed martial artists
Featherweight mixed martial artists
Mixed martial artists utilizing shootboxing
Japanese male kickboxers
Lightweight kickboxers